Du Runsheng (July 18, 1913 – October 9, 2015) was a Chinese military officer, revolutionary leader, politician, and economist. He has been hailed as "China's father of rural reform". From 1982 to 1986, he drew up the annual "Document No.1 of the Central Government" about rural reform, which promoted the development of rural areas. Du's students included Wang Qishan, Justin Yifu Lin, Zhou Qiren, Wen Tiejun, Wang Xiaoqiang, Chen Xiwen, Zhang Musheng, Du Ying and Weng Yongxi.

Du was a member of the 12th and 13th National People's Congress and a member of the Central Advisory Commission.

Biography

Education and early career
Du was born Du De on July 18, 1913 in Yangyi Village of Taigu County, Shanxi province, during the dawn of the Republic of China. He was accepted to Taiyuan National Normal College in 1929 and he entered Beijing Normal University in 1934. In 1935 he was detained by the Beiyang government for taking part in anti-government movement.

Military campaign in north China
He joined the Communist Party of China in 1936. That same year, he served as chief captain of the Vanguard of National Liberation and head of its propaganda department. During the Second Sino-Japanese War, he served in various administrative and political roles Taihang Mountain border. He participated in the Huai-Hai Campaign during the Chinese Civil War. He served successively as secretary-general of Central Plains Bureau of the CPC Central Committee, secretary-general of Central China Bureau of the CPC Central Committee, and party boss of CPC Henan-Anhui-Jiangsu Committee.

Land reform 
Du was one of the Party's foremost rural experts and served an important role in China's land reform movement. According to Du, settling accounts through the land reform movement focused on mobilizing peasants to:
The subsequent study of the land reform movement overseen and edited by Du concludes that "[l]and reform was not only a profound economic transformation, but a profound political transformation as well, a prelude to the establishment and construction of a new China." In Du's view, land reform was significant in constructing a China within the mold of the modern nation-state system and in China's peasants developing class consciousness. Du recounted:

According to Du, this reorganization of the grassroots increased the organizational mobilizing capacity of the central government, enhancing its ability to unify the country and its political direction and "[w]ith regard to an agrarian nation that had previously been seen as a 'plate of loose sand,' the significance of all this was enormous."

After the establishment of PRC
After the founding of the Communist State, Du became secretary-general of Central China Bureau of the CPC Central Committee and its deputy director of the Land Reform Commission. He led the local land reform movement. In 1953, he was transferred to Beijing and he joined the newly created Central Rural Work Department of the Communist Party of China, working as secretary-general of the Head Deng Zihui. He vigorously developed the private economy, but got criticized for "taking the capitalist road". Mao Zedong evaluated him as "a timid and conservative man".
He also served as deputy director of the Rural Office of the State Council. From 1956 towards, he served successively as deputy director of the Office of Scientific Planning Commission of the State Council, secretary-general and deputy party group secretary of Chinese Academy of Sciences.

Cultural Revolution
In 1966, Mao Zedong launched the Cultural Revolution, Du Runsheng was suspended and suffered political persecution. In 1970, he was sent to the May Seventh Cadre Schools to work in Qianjiang, Hubei.

Economic reforms
In December 1978, after the 3rd Plenary Session of the 11th Central Committee of the Communist Party of China, he was rehabilitated by Hu Yaobang.

He was deputy director of National Agricultural Commission of the People's Republic of China in 1979, and held that office until 1983, when he promoted to become director of Rural Policy Research Office of Secretariat of the Communist Party of the Soviet Union and director of Rural Development Research Center of the State Council, he remained in that positions until 1989, while these two agencies were canceled.  In 1980, he drafted the Several Problems about the Further Strengthening and Improving the System of Rural Production Responsibility, which made the household responsibility system first gained legal status.

He served as honorary president of  Chinese Association of Agricultural Science Societies, president of  China Society of Cooperative Economics, director-general of Chinese Association of Agricultural Economics, and director-general of China Society of Territorial Economists in his old age.

Death
On October 9, 2015, he died in Beijing Hospital, Beijing.

Personal life
Du had a daughter, Du Xia.

References

External links
 
 
 

1913 births
2015 deaths
Beijing Normal University alumni
People's Republic of China economists
Chinese Communist Party politicians from Shanxi
People's Republic of China politicians from Shanxi
20th-century Chinese economists
21st-century Chinese economists
Chinese centenarians
Men centenarians
Politicians from Jinzhong
People of the Republic of China
Economists from Shanxi
People's Republic of China writers
Writers from Shanxi